Stranded assets are "assets that have suffered from unanticipated or premature write-downs, devaluations or conversion to liabilities". Stranded assets can be caused by a variety of factors and are a phenomenon inherent in the 'creative destruction' of economic growth, transformation and innovation; as such they pose risks to individuals and firms and may have systemic implications.   Climate change is expected to cause a significant increase in stranded assets for carbon-intensive industries and investors, with a potential ripple effect throughout the world economy.
 
The term is important to financial risk management in order to avoid economic loss after an asset has been converted to a liability. Accountants have measures to deal with the impairment of assets (e.g. IAS 16) which seek to ensure that an entity's assets are not carried at more than their recoverable amount. In this context, stranded assets are also defined as an asset that has become obsolete or non-performing, but must be recorded on the balance sheet as a loss of profit.

Climate-related asset stranding 

The term stranded assets has gained significant prominence in environmental and climate change discourse, where the focus has been on how environment-related factors (such as climate change) could strand assets in different sectors. The term "climate-related asset stranding" is often used in this context. This will affect oil, gas, and coal companies, and "carbon-intensive industries such as steel, aluminum, cement, plastics, and greenhouse horticulture".  More broadly, countries that rely on fossil fuel exports and workers with technology-specific skills can be thought of in terms of stranded assets.
According to the Stranded Assets Programme at the University of Oxford's Smith School of Enterprise and the Environment, some of the environment-related risk factors that could result in stranded assets are:

 environmental challenges (e.g. climate change, natural capital degradation)
 changing resource landscapes including resource depletion (e.g. shale-gas abundance, phosphate scarcity)
 new government regulations (e.g. carbon pricing, air pollution regulation, carbon bubble)
 falling clean-technology costs (e.g. solar photovoltaics, onshore wind, electric vehicles)
 evolving social norms (e.g. fossil fuel divestment campaign) and consumer behaviour (e.g. certification schemes)
 litigation (e.g. carbon liability) and changing statutory interpretations (e.g. fiduciary duty, disclosure requirements)

In the context of upstream energy production, the International Energy Agency defines stranded assets as "those investments which are made but which, at some time prior to the end of their economic life (as assumed at the investment decision point), are no longer able to generate an economic return, as a result of changes in the market and regulatory environment."

The carbon bubble is one popular example of how an environment-related risk factor could create stranded assets. Another example is pre-end of life decommissioning of nuclear power stations, decided by the German government and debated in Japan after the Fukushima Daiichi nuclear disaster. In Japan however, the decommissioning of the nuclear power plants remains difficult because with 42 operable reactors in place and only 9 reactors in 5 power plants actually operating, a huge amount of low-carbon power production gets lost if the decommissioning is permanent. In other countries, when nuclear power reactors are decommissioned, this low-carbon power production is sometimes replaced by high-carbon power production (i.e. fossil fuel power plants such as coal-fired power plants, ...) As much as 20-22% of the nation's portfolio mix would need to remain as nuclear power in order to reach the Paris agreement. 26 restart applications are now pending with an estimated 12 units to come back in service by 2025 and 18 by 2030. While nuclear power stations contribute very little to climate change, they do pose other risks (i.e. on safety, nuclear waste, ...). Asset stranding of fission reactors is hereby more likely to occur due to environmental and human safety reasons then due to climate change-related reasons. While some slightly newer types of reactors do allow to reduce the safety risks significantly (see passive nuclear safety, thorium-based nuclear power, nuclear fusion reactor), older types of reactors (which may already have been built and which are still able to be re-employed) may not possess such highly increased safety features, although safety can be improved somewhat by simply using alternative fuel pellets and cladding in existing reactors. The mining of nuclear fuel itself however remains very controversial and is thus prone to risk unlike the existing stock of "spent" nuclear fuel -which in reality still contains much energy for use (see nuclear reprocessing)-. The nuclear waste (existing stockpile of nuclear waste) -which forms a constant health hazard- could be greatly reduced by reprocessing of the existing nuclear waste stock (see reuse, reduce, recycle), and can act as a fuel in breeder reactors. However, it may not be done due to various reasons. In financial terms, not only is the payback time of the asset curtailed, acceleration of decommissioning liabilities also increases their net present cost. When decisions result from changes to government legislation, liabilities exceeding decommissioning provisions accumulated over the asset's useful life may need to be shouldered by the tax payer, as opposed to the owner/operator.

In discussions of electric power generation deregulation, the related term stranded costs represents the existing investments in infrastructure for the incumbent utility that may become redundant in a competitive environment.

Stranded assets by sector

Energy sector

Companies extracting fossil fuels (fossil oil, coal) face the threat that, due to their contribution towards global warming, consumers could switch to emissionless alternative fuels instead (i.e. hydrogen, biofuels, ...). Also, there is the threat that fossil fuel subsidies might be cut (partially or completely) in some areas (see European Green Deal). Some oil companies have stated that the changing energy landscape coupled with the economic toll of the COVID-19 pandemic means that the global crude demand will never again surpass 2019's average. BP is already attempting to move from being an international oil company into becoming an integrated energy company that will focus on low-carbon technologies while also setting a target to reduce its overall oil and gas production by 40% by 2030. Exxon Mobil has been working on algae fuels since at least 2013 and it reported a breakthrough in the joint research into advanced biofuels in 2017.

It should be mentioned here that oil companies produce not only fuel (i.e. gasoline, diesel, ...) from crude oil but also produce various fossil oil derivates which are used by the petrochemical industry. To replace fossil oil-based plastic, the petrochemical industry itself is looking at bioplastics (preferably biodegradable ones to avoid issues with plastic pollution) which are made using substances obtained from crops (biorefining). In some cases, existing fossil oil refineries can be repurposed as biorefineries Biorefineries may produce alternative fuels, but also a wide range of other derivates depending on the feedstock used.

If consumers indeed completely switch to emissionless fuels for powering their vehicles, then this would reduce profitability of their fossil fuel extracting installations (as less large amounts of their fossil fuels are sold). To reduce or eliminate this threat, several possibilities exist:

 Some installations, such as oil wells for instance can be repurposed to pump  into rocks below the seabed—however, not all  abandoned wells are suitable for long-term storage.
 Natural gas still has a place in the hydrogen economy, assuming however if it is converted to hydrogen for use in fossil fuel power plants and if the carbon that is separated off during this process is captured and stored (see Natural gas-fired power station conversion to hydrogen).
 Companies owning coal-fired fossil-fuel power stations may choose to convert their fossil power plant to run on less polluting fuels (biofuels, ...) or change it to a grid energy storage system which use electric thermal energy storage (ETES). Carbon capture and storage/carbon capture and utilization technologies (post-combustion) can theoretically also be applied when still using coal as a combustible material in fossil fuel power stations. In addition to capturing  other contaminants otherwise emitted from these power plants, this may help to ensure that pollution levels from the power plants are heavily reduced or eliminated. Avoiding the emission of pollutants from fossil fuel power plants is essential to help avoid the possibility of lawsuits being filed against the operators of the power plant.
 Coal is generally retrieved from coal mines. The extraction of coal is done by miners, which, exposed to the coal dust, risk contracting lung and skin problems (besides a multitude of other dangers, see mining accident). Depending on the contract closed with the miners, the mine owner can be at risk of being sued for fatal accidents and other health damage caused by the laborers working in the mine. Also, the extraction of coal tends to have major cost-effectiveness and competitiveness problems when compared to other sources of energy such as natural gas, nuclear power, ... Coal mine operation may halt because of this, and/or when the coal present in the mine runs out or is no longer easily extractable. They however can still be of use in other ways. Mines (lower shafts) for instance also often contain water and geothermal heat. These products may or may not be extractable and sellable. In addition, old mine shafts in mines can be repurposed for grid energy storage.

Some cities have low emission zones in place, which put limits on the allowed exhaust gas emissions. Not all combustion engine vehicles may reach these emission limits and vehicle owners may decide to convert their vehicle to run on a different fuel because of it (which is emissionless). Possibilities include conversion of their existing vehicle to electric propulsion (see electric vehicle conversion), conversion of their existing vehicle to hydrogen (see hydrogen internal combustion engine vehicle), ethanol, biobutanol, biodiesel, bioether, ... (see alternative fuel vehicle). Availability of biofuel fuel stations differ per region, but for hydrogen for instance, hydrogen stations exist that can generate hydrogen in-situ and are suitable for home use, and many countries are also working on converting their natural gas pipeline system (see hydrogen economy).

Agriculture and forestry

In agriculture and forestry, the risk of the stranding of assets is significant.

Assets are at risk of becoming stranded due to technological advances in agriculture, changes in environmental regulations and policies and natural disasters (i.e. flooding, storms, drought, ...).
Crops may be damaged or destroyed by flooding of fields, hailstorms and drought. Livestock may suffer or die due to lack of water or vegetation (grass in meadows). Also, due to climate change, weather variability has increased (see effects of climate change) and natural disasters occur more frequently, increasing the risk further.

The Coller FAIRR Protein Producer Index has been created which has compiled a list of protein producing companies, giving some insight into the likeliness of some agricultural companies of being stranded. It has ranked many companies in the meat, fish and dairy sector as performing poorly.

The keeping of livestock typically requires a lot of space (see food vs. feed, land use) and isn't necessarily efficient (see agricultural productivity, food vs. feed, feed conversion ratio). There is currently a move towards agricultural systems that don't take up much space (i.e. vertical farms) and are ideally also located near the consumer, to minimize issues in logistics (see local food, Farm-to-table, urban farming, vertical farm). Some vertical farms have been fully automated for even greater efficiency and more growing layers. Abandoned buildings near towns can for example be converted to vertical farms which not only achieve the benefits mentioned, but also repurposes the building (which is technically speaking already a stranded asset).

Meadows (required for cattle to graze on) also aren't effective carbon sinks compared to forests (which are projected to increase, see below). The livestock itself also generates huge carbon emissions (see environmental impact of meat production).

In the Netherlands, a transition to a circular agriculture system is underway, which will close the fodder-manure cycle, reuse waste streams, and reduce the use of artificial fertilizers. It also provides the opportunity to agricultural entrepreneurs to sign an agreement with the Staatsbosbeheer ("State forest management") to have it use the lands they lease for natuurinclusieve landbouw ("nature-inclusive management"). This hence allows to help address the space issue (meadows taking up space for forest-based carbon sinks/biosequestration zones).
Silvopasture is another solution in this regard.

In some countries, such as Ireland and the Netherlands, there is a discussion ongoing on shrinking the amount of livestock kept in the country (by in some cases, up to 50%).

Other options are also being explored to reduce the impact of livestock on the environment such as genetic selection introduction of methanotrophic bacteria into the rumen, diet modification and grazing management.

Some farmers have started to adopting move towards less meat production (smaller herds), but which is higher in quality (taste) and thus also in price (i.e. by feeding their livestock exclusively or predominantly with grass, ...). See organic farming and ecolabel for details on this mechanism. By using only or predominantly grass, emissions are also typically somewhat lower and taste can be improved.

Regardless of this, some reports still speak of a large decline of livestock at least some animals (e.g. cattle) in certain countries by 2030. The book The End of Animal Farming argues that all animal husbandry will end by 2100.

Milk substitutes, clean meat, meat analogues and single cell protein could then help to address the void created by such a decline of some livestock species. Also, non-ruminant livestock (e.g. poultry) generates far fewer emissions then ruminant livestock.(see environmental impact of meat production)

Price variability of crops also poses a financial risk to farmers. Some have switched to community-supported agriculture, in which the farmer is paid a fixed price for crops he supplies to his customers on a weekly or monthly basis (subscription). This avoids price variability and thus reduces financial risk for the farmer.

First-generation biofuels are fuels made from food crops grown on arable land. There has already been a freeze on first-generation biofuels. Also some oils which are used as first-generation biofuels (such as palm oil) are criticized for their impact on the natural environment, including deforestation, loss of natural habitats, and greenhouse gas emissions which have threatened critically endangered species, such as the orangutan and Sumatran tiger.

Regarding forestry, there is currently much interest into reforestation due to the biosequestration potential. The Trillion Tree Campaign aims to replant 1 trillion trees and repair damaged ecosystems. The protecting of areas is also seen as a mechanism that can help boost the carbon sequestration capacity. The European Union, through the EU Biodiversity Strategy for 2030 targets to protect 30% of the sea territory and 30% of the land territory by 2030. Also, Campaign for Nature's 30x30 for Nature Petition tries to let governments agree to the same goal during the Convention on Biodiversity COP15 Summit. has the same target. The One Earth Climate Model advises a protection of 50% of our lands and oceans. It also stresses the importance of rewilding, like other reports. The reason being that predators keep the population of herbivores in check (which reduce the biomass of vegetation), and also impact their feeding behaviour.

Fish production
In the fish sector, aquaculture is becoming popular. Unlike regular fishing, it does not require the catching of wild fish in open sea. Rather, fish is grown in nets in the sea or in containers, ponds, ... on land, which hence does not require the use of fishing ships. Fishing ships are expensive to purchase and maintain and operate (fuel costs), while a catch is never guaranteed (nor the amount that can be caught per fishing trip). In order to reduce the possibility of diseases occurring in closed circuit systems, integrated multi-trophic aquaculture is used which integrates fish farming and aquatic plant farming. Plants hereby take up nutrients excreted from the fish, reducing the likelihood of diseases occurring.

In shrimp farming, integrated mangrove-shrimp aquaculture exists, which farms shrimp in mangroves rather than in closed ponds. This also avoids possibility of diseases occurring. In addition to this, it may be an incentive for entrepreneurs to restore mangroves in locations where they have previously been destroyed, as they can then reap the financial benefits of those newly created mangroves.

Clean fish also exists, which is lab-grown fish. This offers some benefits to the producer (see above) and also to the customer, as the fish comes without fishbones and is easy to eat.

Tourism
In some low-lying coastal areas, the risk of buildings being inundated has increased due to the effects of climate change (sea level rise). However, the risk of construction (for construction companies, investors, ...) decreases if preventive measures (are planned to be) executed.

Presence of litter (non-biodegradable plastic waste, ...), untreated sewage, ... -i.e. by on tourist locations impacts the tourism sector (hotels, ...) negatively (as potential visitors may decide to go elsewhere instead, ...) Cleanups can be done to remove litter, as well as the implementation of measures such as municipal waste collection (in areas where this is not yet present), implementation of container-deposit legislation, use of biodegradable plastics (food packaging), ...

Retail
Some supermarkets have started supplying more food in bulk (using dispensers, ...) and using non-plastic packaging for food (see zero-waste supermarket). This avoids costs on the purchase of plastic containers, and avoids health concerns consumers may have regarding plastic food container use (see health issues on plastic food containers).

Transport

Technology change may cause other stranded assets. For example, moving to mobility as a service (in city centers, ... -see carfree city center-) (i.e. through shared vehicles, public transport, ...) may mean that much car manufacturing capacity becomes stranded (unless that car manufacturing capacity can be reused for manufacturing other vehicles, see modal shift, road reallocation, bicycle highway, sustainable&smart mobility).

For freight transport, entrepreneurs can opt to transport their goods by rail or sea as an alternative to road transport (for a section or the entirety of the trajectory). This avoids possible problems such as road congestion, blind spot accidents (and other accidents) with trucks in city center streets, ... Road congestion may cause delivery delays, and accidents involving trucks may lead to legal problems and represent possible extra costs for the company.

For last-mile delivery (i.e. in city centers), distribution centers can be used. They allow easy restocking of supermarkets, outlet stores, restaurants, and more in city centers. They rely on tractor units to unload their cargo in the suburban distribution center. 
The products are then placed in a small truck (sometimes electrically powered), cargo bike, or other vehicle to bridge the last mile to the destination in the city center. Besides offering advantages to the population (increased safety due to truck drivers having less blind spots, reduced noise/traffic, reduced tailpipe emissions, and more), it also offers financial advantage for the companies, as tractor units require a lot of time to bridge this last mile (they lack agility and consume much fuel in congested streets).

In instances where trucks need to be used for the entirety or part of the trajectory (within or outside heavily populated zones), driverless trucks can be used. Besides the use of purpose-build driverless trucks, there are also driverless systems that are more or less portable (somewhat similar to movable satellite navigation systems) and which can be installed inside existing trucks. Driverless trucks may (depending on the system, proper installation, experience of the regular human driver against which the system is compared, ...) improve road safety (resulting in fewer accidents or less serious ones). Also, driverless trucks could enable new business models that would see deliveries shift from day time to night time or time slots in which traffic is less heavily dense. In many instances, semi-driverless systems are used which still requires a driver to be present and take over at particular times. However, even so, it still heavily reduces labour requirements of the driver, and may as such reduce driver fatigue.. Driver fatigue is an important factor that promotes vehicle accidents.

See also
 Recycling concrete of abandoned buildings
 Carbon bubble
 Carbon offsetting: used by companies to reduce their carbon emissions
 Carbon tax: internal carbon taxes are levied by companies to reduce climate change-related risk exposure
 Climate lawsuit
 Disruptive innovation
 Environmental stewardship
 Economics of climate change
 Ghost town repopulation
 Leapfrogging
 Land recycling

References

External links 
 Stranded Assets Programme. University of Oxford.
 Stranded Assets. Carbon Tracker

Asset
Technological change
Risk management